The following are fictional characters from Disney's 1940 film Fantasia, its 1999 sequel Fantasia 2000 and the 2014 video game Fantasia: Music Evolved. Characters in this list are sorted by the film and segment in which they appear.

Notable and recurring characters 
Notable recurring characters in Disney's Fantasia franchise.

Mickey Mouse 

Mickey Mouse is Yen Sid's apprentice in The Sorcerer's Apprentice segment. Mickey Mouse as the Sorcerer's Apprentice has become such an iconic role for the character that he is regularly depicted as such in the Disney parks. Mickey is seen wearing his famous red wizard's robe and blue sorcerer's hat in numerous parades as well as in the nighttime spectacular they vanished Fantasmic! at both Disneyland and Disney's Hollywood Studios at Walt Disney World. The Sorcerer's Hat was also a former park icon of Disney's Hollywood Studios and also is involved heavily in the plot of Mickey's PhilharMagic at the Magic Kingdom. A very large version of the hat is also seen at the entrance of the Walt Disney Animation Studios building at the Walt Disney Studios in Burbank, California (and can be easily seen from both Riverside Drive and the 134 Freeway). Walt Disney Home Entertainment, Disney's home video sales division featured "Sorcerer Mickey" on its covers starting from its inception in 1980, and he appears in the logo for Walt Disney Imagineering, the subsidiary of the company responsible for designing the Disney parks and resorts.

Yen Sid 

Yen Sid ("Disney" spelled backwards) is the powerful sorcerer in Fantasia, appearing as an old man with a long beard and robes that extended to the floor. In the segment, he executes a series of spells which are observed by his apprentice Mickey Mouse, then decides to take a rest, leaving his hat behind. Mickey takes the hat and uses its magic to bring a broom to life to finish the chore of bringing water in from the well. However, Mickey does not know how to stop the magic now that it has been activated, and after he falls asleep, the entire basement is flooded. Eventually, Yen Sid reappears, and uses his magic to recede the waters and undo the spell that caused the problem in the first place. From there, he takes back his hat and broom, and uses the broom to send Mickey back to finish his chores.

In later media 
Decades after the film's release Yen Sid began appearing in media ranging from Disney theme parks to video games.

On the 1971 The Wonderful World of Disney episode "Disney on Parade", Yen Sid (referred to as Merlin and voiced by Michael Rye) makes a brief appearance to chastise Mickey as well as test his abilities. 

Yen Sid is voiced by Corey Burton in the Disneyland attraction Mickey and the Magical Map in Anaheim, California. Burton also voices the character in the Disney/Square Enix video game series Kingdom Hearts, marking Yen Sid's first consistent speaking role. Burton voices Yen Sid in the Epic Mickey game series as both the narrator and as the creator of a pen-and-paper world for all of Disney's forgotten creations to reside, including Oswald the Lucky Rabbit before Mickey's unintentional actions turn it into the Wasteland.

Yen Sid also appears in Fantasia: Music Evolved where he employs the player as his new apprentice. Yen Sid appears in Disney Magical World as the creator of the primary world known as Castleton, the peaceful home of dozens of citizens and Disney characters. Aside from appearing in the opening cinematic for the game, Yen Sid also summons the player to seek help defeating an army of ghosts that have invaded the tranquil realm.

In the Once Upon A Time television series Yen Sid is shown to be the possible landlord of the house in Storybrooke where the Apprentice lives. 

In the Descendants prequel novel The Isle of the Lost, Yen Sid is living on the titular Isle, positioned at the Dragon Hall school and helping students adapt to life without magical recourse.

Donald Duck 

Donald Duck is Noah's assistant, whose job is that he's supposed to get the animals on board the ark before the land gets flooded.

Daisy Duck 

Daisy Duck is Donald's girlfriend. In Pomp and Circumstance, she and Donald get separated from each other during the flood but get reunited in the end when the flood dries up.

Chernabog 

Chernabog is the massive nocturnal devil in Night on Bald Mountain, who can take people's hearts and holds power over various restless souls. His name is taken from Chernobog, a deity of Slavic mythology; the name is Slavic for "black god".  While officially a pagan god,  Chernabog might have originally been intended as a representation of Satan: when "Night on Bald Mountain" appeared on the original Wonderful World of Disney, Walt Disney referred to Chernabog as "Satan himself." Deems Taylor also refers to Chernabog as "Satan" in the film.

Chernabog is first seen disguised as the spire on top of Bald Mountain until he spreads his draconic wings, revealing himself. It is Walpurgis Night and, using the powers of darkness, he raises ghosts, monsters, fire women, a fleet of monstrous imps, blue satyrs, witches and demons from a nearby town with a cemetery. Ghosts of Criminals pass through the noose a second time, while others rise from the moat surrounding the ruins of an abandoned ancient castle. He then also summons fire and makes the ghosts and the other creatures in his control dance and fly around, before he throws them into a volcanic pit and resurrects them as demons. Harpies fly around as the cavorting gets more chaotic, throwing unfortunate, deformed creatures into the multi-hued flames. Chernabog is at the height of his power, showing off in a display that sends a column of fire into the air, which returns to the chasm in a sheet of flame. An instant before continuing the demonic celebration, with the coming of the dawn Chernabog hears the tolling of the Angelus Bell; he is then forced to cover himself with his wings as the demons leap back down the pit, the ghosts return to their graves, and the dark ceremony ceases as morning arrives.

In other media 
Chernabog appears as one of the Disney Villains in both versions of the Fantasmic! nighttime spectacular at Disneyland in Anaheim, California and the Disney's Hollywood Studios in Orlando, Florida. Here he is summoned by the Evil Queen from Snow White and the Seven Dwarfs to fight Mickey Mouse. In both versions of Fantasmic! his role is similar to that in Fantasia, with him summoning ghosts. He has no spoken dialogue, but growls, cackles, and screams during his appearances in the show. In the end, Mickey defeats Chernabog along with the other villains with his imagination. He also previously appeared in the original version of World of Color at Disney California Adventure, but was replaced in 2011 with an extended Pirates of The Caribbean sequence. His sequence has not been restored. Before the premiere of World of Color, a large fountain effect was created so he could appear towering over the rest of the show. However, due to technical problems, the effect was ultimately removed before the show opened. He also appears in parade floats in Disney amusement parks.

Chernabog appeared in the Disney/Square Enix crossover game Kingdom Hearts as a surprise boss who rules over the "End of the World", serving as the fight before Ansem. Chernabog attacks by breathing fire, invoking an eruption from the mountain he stands in, summoning spirits to attack Sora, Donald and Goofy and flinging balls of fire. "Night on Bald Mountain" serves as the music during this boss battle in the North American, PAL and Final Mix version of the game, making him the only Disney villain in the game to have his own unique boss music. He returns in Kingdom Hearts 3D: Dream Drop Distance as a boss fight in Riku's story in the Symphony of Sorcery world based upon Fantasia.

Chernabog is also seen as a guest in Disney's House of Mouse where he is voiced by Corey Burton. Here, we can see his legs. He is more than an actual villain. In one particular episode, he sheepishly admits to Clarabelle Cow that he is afraid of the dark and in another during a blackout, he admits that he is "kind of afraid of the dark". In one episode, he even reenacts a part of the Night on Bald Mountain segment before Pete tries to push him (and Bald Mountain) away with a bulldozer, which provokes the evil spirits that chase the selfish cat out of the club. In the Mickey's House of Villains direct-to-DVD film, he is shown to have some sort of relationship with Maleficent's dragon form, stating (during the song) that he loves her work. They are seen again together shortly before Mickey's fight with Jafar, during the sequence that parodies the segment The Rite of Spring.

Chernabog makes an appearance in Disney at Dawn, the second book of The Kingdom Keepers series. Though he is mentioned numerous times throughout, his major role is at the end of the book, where it is revealed that he has been trapped by Disney Imagineers in the form of the Yeti in the Disney's Animal Kingdom attraction Expedition Everest. He is freed by Maleficent, and flies out of the mountain, before escaping capture and escaping from the park. In a cliffhanger ending, it is reported he and Maleficent have most likely taken shelter in MGM Studios.

During season 4 of Once Upon A Time the Chernabog is released in Storybrooke.

A painting of Chernabog can be seen in the Lonesome Manor Foyer in Epic Mickey and he also appears in the film reel segments based upon his segment in Epic Mickey 2: The Power of Two.

Chernabog makes two appearances in the 2013 Mickey Mouse series, in episodes "Touchdown and Out" and "The Scariest Story Ever".

Fantasia (1940 film) characters 
This section excludes Toccata and Fugue in D Minor, as no characters actually appear in that segment.

Nutcracker Suite 
 The Fairies are tiny creatures that have control over nature. There are different types of them to control over each season. They appear in the form of tiny little women with a single color on them according to their abilities, with leathery wings. They are completely naked like the cupids in The Pastoral Symphony. They have different types. The first are the Dewdrop Fairies, who make dewdrops in flowers and webs and have different colors (pink, red, green, emerald with yellow,  blue and orange) when they are dancing the Dance of the Sugar Plum Fairy, the first dance of the segment. The other types of fairies are the Summer Fairies, who are green and change spring to summer. After they have woken up and gone away another type, the Autumn Fairies, who are orange and grey and change summer to autumn, make the leaves fall and change color. Next are the ice blue coloured Frost Fairies who wake up, turning autumn to winter, icing the lakes and rivers. The last are the Snowflake Fairies who have pale color skin and wear crowns. Around their bodies they wear a snowflake and fall to earth, making snow. The fairies of summer, autumn and winter dance the Waltz of the Flowers, which is the last dance of this segment.
 Hop Low and the Dancing Mushrooms A dance sequence of six mushrooms plus a tiny mushroom named Hop Low who is out of step with the rest of the group and steals the show. They are dancing the Chinese Dance with Hop Low always missing steps. Hop Low's name is never mentioned in the film but mentioned in the theatrical trailer.
 The Dancing Flowers (based on the blossoms) play a similar role to that of the Dancing Mushrooms, coming to life due to the fairies' magic. They are dancing the Dance of the Reed Flutes. These flowers dancing in a river leading by a white flower (the others are pink, orange, yellow and blue) and make a circle around it. Finally all fall from a water fall and make bubbles.
 The Goldfish. They do not strictly dance, but swim around accompanied by the music. They are dancing the Arabian Dance. The goldfish in the beginning is alone but later many other different colored (pink, red and yellow with blue spots) and in the end all together finish with tail moves by making bubbles.
 The Dancing Thistles and the Dancing Orchids perform the Russian Dance. The Dancing Thistles take the form of Cossacks and the Dancing Orchids take the form of peasant girls. In the beginning many thistles with different colors (white, pink, rose, red, orange and yellow) dance, then variously-colored orchids (white, pink, yellow, blue, violet and orange) dance, and finally the thistles and the orchids dance in couples and turn to their normal form.

The Sorcerer's Apprentice 
 The Broomsticks appear because of Mickey's magic. When Mickey tries to do one of the wizard's spells by making a broomstick come to life and to get arms, the broomstick is supposed to do Mickey's job; however, Mickey's magic seems to get out of control. Mickey tries to stop it by smashing it with an axe. The remaining pieces of the broomstick all turn into an army of additional broomsticks. They flood the house until the magic is stopped by Yen Sid. The Broomsticks also made cameo appearances in Disney's House of Mouse, Who Framed Roger Rabbit, and the Kingdom Hearts video game series. They also appear followed by a giant one in Mickey's PhilharMagic. A blotling version of them, known as Sweepers, appeared in Epic Mickey and the broomsticks themselves make cameos, both in the transition levels based on Fantasia and in the credits of the game. The broomsticks also appeared in Epic Mickey 2: The Power of Two.

The Rite of Spring 
 The Tyrannosaurus rex is a large meat-eating dinosaur in The Rite of Spring. Its appearance consists of it chasing other dinosaurs, a pursuit in which it succeeds as it subdues a Stegosaurus. Another Tyrannosaurus collapses in thirst while walking with the other dinosaurs in the drought. The tyrant king makes an appearance in Disney's Bonkers TV series, attempting to eat Sergeant Grating but stops its effort in order to take a coffee break. The Tyrannosaurus rex's appearance was considered correct at the time of the film, as back then it was thought to have stood up straight. It is also depicted with three claws (like Allosaurus) on each arm rather than two, as Disney felt that "it looked better that way".
 The Stegosaurus is a large plated plant-eating dinosaur. It is the victim of the Tyrannosaurus rex after a wild battle that is defeated and eaten. The Stegosaurus was one of the dinosaurs that flee with the herbivorous (and small carnivorous) dinosaurs. More can be seen during the extinction.

Intermission/Meet the Soundtrack 
 Soundtrack is said to be the film's soundtrack. The Soundtrack takes the appearance of a white string instrument-like being. Apparently it can make any sound in the world, changing its appearance to match the sound it makes. The instruments are a harp, a violin, a flute, a trumpet, a bassoon, and percussion. At the end is a triangle.

The Pastoral Symphony 
 Bacchus is the god of wine. The mythological creatures in this segment gather for a bacchanal to honor him. He is followed by the Zebra Centaurettes and Bacchus goes in his throne (which tumbles with him in it) and afterwards, starts to pine for the centaurettes. His celebrations stop when Zeus throws bolts at him and Jacchus but a bolt hits the wine tank and Bacchus happily starts to drink the wine.
 Jacchus is Bacchus's unicorn donkey. He is Bacchus' pet and is with him everywhere. He was, like Bacchus, attacked by Zeus's thunderbolts. His name (apparently a play on Bacchus and jackass) is never mentioned in the program.
 The Centaurs are creatures that are half horse and half man. They are waiting for the Centaurettes and after they arrive, go out to find their fiancees
 Brudus is a black-haired blue centaur with purple horse legs. His name is never mentioned in the program.
The Centaurettes are female centaurs and the lovers of the centaurs. They appear to have characteristics of the Disney Princesses and (as Snow White was the only Princess around at the time) may even have inspired the designs of all the later Princesses.
 Melinda is a blonde-haired blue centaurette with pigtails decorated in pink bows. She also wears colorful flowers around her breasts and waist. Her legs are darker than her skin and her tail is a little darker than her hair from her head. Lured by the three cupids who play the horns, she first sees Brudus and begins to fall in love with him. Her name is never mentioned in the program.
 Sunflower and Otika are little black centaurettes with donkey bodies. Their appearance resembles a European American in blackface with exaggerated facial features and a stereotypical black female hair style, a common comic caricature of the time. By contemporary standards such depictions are considered racist and they have ultimately been edited out of the film since the 1969 re-release. Their names are also no longer mentioned in the program.
 The Zebra Centaurettes are centaurettes half zebra and half Nubian. They are followers of Bacchus. Despite the editing out of Sunflower and Otika, these characters have remained in the film even after the 1969 re-release
 The Cupids are winged baby-like creatures and followers of Aphrodite the goddess of love. They also assist the Centaurettes.
 The Fauns are horned creatures that are half goat and half man and love to play flute.
 Iris, Apollo, Morpheus and Diana are Olympian Gods. Iris is the goddess of the Rainbow, she has a cloak with the rainbow and covers the sky with it, Apollo is the god of the Sun and music, he carries the sun with his fiery sun chariot, Morpheus is the god of the Night and sleep who covers the sunset sky with his cloak of night, as Diana the goddess of the Moon and hunting uses the curve of the crescent moon as a bow and with her arrow of silver fire creates the stars all over the night sky.
 Pegasus and family are winged horses like Pegasus and have a family, the members have different colors (the Father Pegasus is black, the Mother Pegasus is white and the Baby Pegasi are pink, blue, orange, yellow and black, who was named Peter Pegasus in production documents). Along with them appeared a lot of other pegasi. Peter Pegasus makes a cameo in Who Framed Roger Rabbit.
 Zeus is the king of all the gods. He is the controller of the weather and appears to throw thunderbolts at the bacchanal attendees just for fun, he eventually gets tired and bored near the end and goes to sleep.
 Vulcan is the blacksmith of the gods, who creates Zeus' thunderbolts.
 The Unicorns are horse-like creatures with a horn on their head and are good friends with the fauns. One of the unicorns can be spotted during the final scene of Who Framed Roger Rabbit with the other Toontown inhabitants.
 Boreas is a two-headed cloud that blows Bacchus and Jacchus. It also appears in So Dear to My Heart.

Dance of the Hours 
 Madame Upanova is an anthropomorphic pink dressed ostrich who is the leader of the Ostrich ballet dancing group and the first one to wake up. Her eyelids are purple in the animation and pink (just like her bow and ballerina slippers) in the clip art. According to the old poster, her bow is green and her ballet slippers are yellow. As she feeds some Ostriches some fruit, she tries to eat the grapes she holds in her beak. Her name is never mentioned in the program. Madame Upanova makes two cameo appearances in Who Framed Roger Rabbit. First she walks to the Maroon Cartoons Studio door, giving Eddie Valiant the cold shoulder as she passes him, and finally, her second one is being in the crowd of toons during the final scene. She also is featured in Disney World and Disneyland. She appears in the TV show called House of Mouse where she is voiced by Tress MacNeille. In episode 11, she is seen ducking her head in the three-layered cake with a cherry on top of it she has ordered when Pumbaa is about to fart. Her name is a pun on the phrase "up and over". Although she is a female, she has the appearance of a male ostrich.
 The Ostrich class wears blue bows that match their ballet slippers (Taylor described the ostriches as wearing "costumes to suggest the delicate light of dawn"). There are officially ten of them and they dance in the morning and then in the night. They appear in the beginning of Dance of the Hours and then in the climax. In the beginning they wake up in the morning warming up while one of them ties her ballet slippers and dance until they fight for a bunch of purple grapes that Madame Upanova chooses for herself. They all are then scared by the waking up of the Hippopotamus. In the climax they're found by the alligators and are forced to dance by allowing them to ride on their backs. They have the same appearance just like Madame Upanova does.
 Hyacinth Hippo first appears coming out of a fountain and eats the grapes the Ostriches had been fighting over. She dries herself up by shaking. After she dances with her friends, she gets tired and falls asleep. She continues to sleep (oblivious to any and all floating bubbles and other large animals) until she is awakened by Ben Ali Gator. At first she is scared and bashful, but over the course of a minute of dancing she falls in love with him. She is the only hippo to wear yellow with a brown complexion. Voiced by Tress MacNeille, Hyacinth Hippo makes two cameo appearances in Who Framed Roger Rabbit as one of the toons. She also makes a cameo appearance in "Disney's Bonkers" in Season 2; Episode 32, "Cartoon Cornered", having a small dance with Sergeant Grating followed by his enemy who tears her tutu off his waist. She is featured in Disney World and Disneyland as a pink hippo with a tutu, a pair of ballet slippers and a bow colored blue. Her name is never mentioned in the program but is said by Minnie Mouse in House of Mouse.
 The Hippopotamus servants are Hyacinth Hippo's maids and all wear pink (Taylor described the hippos as being "dressed to represent the brilliant light of noon day"). They dance during the afternoon. After she wakes, they help her into her ballerina dress. When she falls asleep they help her get onto a bed, then they leave the stage. In the final scene they are found by the Alligators and forced to dance. The Hippopotami have a cameo appearance in Mickey's Twice Upon a Christmas, in which they try to help Daisy Duck be the champion in ice skating. At the climax they ice skate with the Alligators.
 Elephanchine is an anthropomorphic elephant. She looks just like the other elephants, so it is never known if it is Elephanchine doing something or it is just one of her elephants. An elephant, presumably Elephanchine, is once seen blowing a bubble with a fish inside, much to her own surprise. Similarly, another elephant gets a bubble stuck on her left foot. Her name is never mentioned in the program. 
 The Elephant partners wear pink Mary Jane ballet slippers (The elephants were described by Taylor as wearing "costumes that suggest the delicate tones of early evening"). They dance during the evening. They also play a similar role to that of the Ostriches, only that they dance making bubbles. They then get blown away by the wind and are later found by the Alligators. They have the ability to blow bubbles through their trunks. 
 Ben Ali Gator is the prince of the Alligators who wears a feather on his hat. He is first seen taking his cape off, jumping off a column and scaring away the Alligators. When he sees the sleeping Hippo he falls in love with her on the spot. They playfully begin a chase which escalates to the final dance. He makes a cameo appearance in Disney's Bonkers in the season 2 episode "Cartoon Cornered", in which he scares Sergeant Grating away. His name is never mentioned in the program.
 The Alligator rivals, in the climax of Dance of the Hours, find all the other animals and force them to dance. When they appear for the first time during the night, they are seen with folded capes wrapped around them, similar to vampires (Taylor describes the alligators as being "all in black, the sombre hours of the night"). They keep themselves shrouded until Hyacinth tries to escape into the columns and they block her. They then partner up with the Hippopotami, Ostriches, and Elephants. Just like the Hippopotami, The Alligators have a cameo appearance in Disney's Mickey's Twice Upon a Christmas. They try to help Minnie Mouse be the champion in ice skating. At the climax they ice skate with the Hippopotami.

Night on Bald Mountain/Ave Maria 
 Chernabog's minions are evil creatures who gather on Walpurgis Night at Bald Mountain after being summoned by Chernabog, including vulture, ghosts, demons, spirits, walking skeletons, pig, wolf, goat, goblins, imps, satyrs, zombies, fire women, hags, harpies and werewolves.
 The Monks are the people with lighted tapers who move in procession while crossing the meadow, going over a bridge and through the woods until the crack of dawn arrives with a beautiful sunrise and the sun's rays appearing from behind a far away hill as the choir sings the last chords of the Ave Maria showing that good always conquers over evil.

Fantasia 2000 characters 
This section excludes The Sorcerer's Apprentice as it was carried-over from the original film.

Symphony No. 5 
 The Butterflies and the Bats fly in a world half light and half darkness, until it is finally conquered by light. The orange butterfly had been bitten on the wing by a bat and is unable to fly faster, a purple one is chased by the bats until he reunites with the butterflies. The one billion butterflies themselves resemble two billion various colorful triangles in reds, oranges, yellows, greens, blues, purples, pinks, and browns in shades, tints, tones, and hues while the bats are shaped as re-entrant polygons.

Pines of Rome 
 The Humpback whale Calf is an excellent jumper. He is separated from his parents when he is trapped in an iceberg he dove into to get away from the angry flock of seagulls, later finding his way out with his mother's help. Just like his parents, the calf can fly. He is very scared of lightning.
 The Humpback Whales are normal whales in the beginning, but then they are able to fly due to a supernova.

Rhapsody in Blue 
 Duke the Builder, is one of the characters who wishes for a better life. He wishes to be a jazz drummer. His job was to drive rivets into girders. In the end, he quits and makes his wish comes true, while in the process inadvertently making the wishes of the other characters who wish for better lives come true, he is now a drummer in a jazz band. His name is never mentioned in the program.
 Rachel the Little Girl, also wishes for a better life: to spend more time with her parents rather than going to her many lessons (ballet, choir, swimming, art, gymnastics, tennis, piano, and violin). In the end, when her ball falls onto the middle of a busy street and she tries to get it, Duke accidentally makes the ball get the attention of her parents; afraid that their daughter would get run over, they grab her just in time. After that, she gets her wish and gets to spend more time with her parents. Her name is never mentioned in the program.
 Flying John the Red-Haired Man with Glasses, also wishes for a better life: to be free from his overbearing and domineering wife. In the end, a hook controlled by Jobless Joe accidentally lifted up John's wife, and John gets his wish and is last seen enjoying himself at the jazz club where Duke works. His name is never mentioned in the program.
 Jobless Joe the Poor Man, also wishes for a better life: to have a job. Despite being poor, he is shown to be extremely honest and dependable. After he finished his morning coffee and found that was unable to pay for it, a nearby man who was also leaving dropped a coin from his jacket sleeve. Joe tried to get his attention, but failed and then left the coin as payment for his coffee. On another occasion he found an apple that fell off of its stand. Though hungry, he was about to put it back, but a policeman, thinking he was trying to steal it, chased him off. Then the policeman himself steals the apple. In the end, when Joe catches Duke's jackhammer, the foreman is led to think that Joe works the night shift, and he becomes a construction worker. His name is never mentioned in the program.
 Killjoy Margaret the wife of Flying John, treats her husband harshly and only seems to care about her puppy Foo-Foo (for example, while at the pet store, she piled a lot of products on Flying John and made him pay the bill), in the end, she and her puppy are accidentally lifted up by a hook controlled by Jobless Joe. Her name is never mentioned in the program.
 The Nanny takes Rachel to her different lessons and goes after Rachel when she runs after her ball. When Rachel is saved by her parents from getting run over, the Nanny faints.
 George Gershwin has a cameo as a pianist playing in his apartment above the room where Rachel takes piano lessons.  This portrayal is based on the Al Hirschfeld caricature of Gershwin.

Piano Concerto No. 2, Allegro, Opus 102 
 The Tin Soldier is based on Hans Christian Andersen's Tin Soldier. He is shown to be uncomfortable that he has only one leg (half his left leg is missing) while the other four soldiers have two. He spots the Ballerina standing on one leg (though the leg that was raised was obscured by her skirt) and falls in love with her. He is then thrown out of the window and into a waste pipe by the jealous and manipulative Jack-in-the-Box. The waste pipe leads him into the sea, there he is swallowed by a fish. The fish is caught and coincidentally bought by the mother of the young boy. The soldier falls out of the fish's mouth in front of his owner, who brings him back to the toy room. In the end, the Soldier defeats the Jack in the Box, and he and the Ballerina are united.
 The Ballerina is based on Hans Christian Andersen's character, but is made of porcelain instead of paper, and she has two legs. In the film a Jack in the Box falls in love with her but she rejects him, instead favoring the Tin Soldier who is also in love with her. After the Jack in the Box throws the Soldier out of the window, she gets angry at him and refuses to have anything at all to do with him. She is finally saved by the Tin Soldier.
 The Jack-in-the-Box is first seen waking up at midnight and falling in love with the Ballerina. When she rejects him, he becomes angry. Then the Tin Soldier comes, also in love, and the Ballerina accepts him. In a fit of rage, the Jack in the Box attacks and uses a large toy boat to knock the Soldier out the window. Then, he tries to woo the Ballerina but fails dramatically and comically. When the Soldier comes back, the Jack in the Box fights him with a sword, but ends up being hurled into the fireplace where he is presumably destroyed and dead.

Carnival of the Animals, Finale 
 The Yo-Yo Flamingo, likes playing with a yo-yo, and knows a lot of tricks. This habit irritates the other flamingos who try to take away his yo-yo; they managed to do so, but the yo-yo flamingo kept spares. He is seen in the House of Mouse where he is accidentally tied up in his own yo-yo string on the table.
 The Snooty Flamingos pride themselves on uniformity and grace, wishing their other member to join the ranks and act the same. They are so frustrated by the yo-yo that they pecked the flamingo to the ground, took the yo-yo away, and tied it to a tree branch. Unfortunately for them, their nonconformist companion ties them up with one of his extras.

Noah's Ark (Pomp and Circumstance – Marches 1, 2, 3 and 4) 
 Noah is based on the Biblical figure who built the Ark. He is first seen calling all the animal couples in the world to enter the ark and he puts Donald in charge of the ark and the animals. Then he is seen patting Donald Duck's head in the climax of the segment.
 The Animal couples are called by Noah to enter the ark and Donald Duck has to get them inside Noah's Ark before the land gets flooded. Some of their designs are recycled from past Disney animated films.

Firebird Suite 
 The Spring Sprite is a green woman-like spirit that has control over growing things. Wherever she goes plants sprout... except the Firebird's mountain. When she curiously explores it, she upsets the firebird who attacks her and burns the forest. She is then brought back to life by the elk, but she is weakened and weeps over the destruction of the forest. Soon she discovers that her tears bring the spark of life back to the forest and she restores life to the land, including the mountain. Her appearance varies according to her surroundings. In the pool she is clear as glass, then as she goes about making things grow she is green, then she becomes pale, when she wakes from the ashes she is the same dull gray color as them, and she at last becomes blue when she sends a healing rain all over the earth.
 The Elk is first seen breathing into an icy pool where the Spring Sprite has weathered the winter. Then he finds her after the Firebird destroys the forest. But as the story goes on he befriends the spring sprite and saves her at the end after the Firebird attacks.
 The Firebird is woken up by the Spring Sprite in a volcano. Angry for being disturbed, he tries to destroy her. During his climax he spreads his fiery wings and descends on her while the forest burns to cinders all around.

Orchestral instruments 
Leopold Stokowski and James Levine are the conductors in the films with the four families of musical instruments.

Woodwinds 
 Flutes
 Alto flute
 Piccolo
 Oboes
 Cor anglais or English horn
 Soprano clarinets
 Bass clarinet
 Bassoons
 Double bassoon or Contrabassoon
 Sopranino saxophone
 Soprano saxophone
 Alto saxophone
 Tenor saxophone
 Baritone saxophone

Brass 
 French horns
 Trumpets
 Tenor trombones
 Bass trombones
 Tubas
 Sousaphone
 Cornets
 Wagner tuba
 Euphonium
 Flugelhorn

Percussion 
 Xylophone
 Vibraphone
 Marimba
 Glockenspiel
 Snare drum
 Bass drum
 Timpani
 Cymbals
 Triangle
 Castanets
 Maracas
 Tambourine
 Tubular bells or Chimes
 Gong or Tam-tam
 Celesta

Piano

Strings 
 Violins
 Violas
 Cellos
 Double basses
 Harps
 Banjo

Fantasia: Music Evolved characters 
Aside from Yen Sid, these characters appear exclusively in Music Evolved.
 Percy is a wisp-like being who serves as the player's guide in Music Evolved, teaching them the basics and guiding them throughout the game's realms. Percy is voiced by Greg Ellis (English). 
 Scout is the former apprentice of Yen Sid in Music Evolved. She unintentionally releases the Noise into the realms of the game and tasks the player with ridding the realms of it. Her outfit is noticeably similar to that of Mickey's and she wears her own variation of the Sorcerer's Hat in the form of a cap. Scout is voiced by Jacqueline Emerson (English).

References 

Characters
Fantasia
Lists of Disney animated film characters